Ben Horner (born May 10, 1989 in Butler, Pennsylvania) is an American soccer player.

Career

College and Amateur
Horner attended Butler High School and played four years of college soccer at the Duquesne University. He led the Dukes in goals, points and game-winning goals in his sophomore college year in 2008, and was a NSCAA Scholar All-East Region Honorable Mention, an ESPN The Magazine Academic All-District selection, and an Atlantic 10 Academic All-Conference selection as a junior in 2009.

After suffering a season ending injuring during the 2014 / 2015 season, Horner returned in the 2017 / 2018 season as the starting center midfielder for the Philadelphia Sports League kelly green team.

Professional
Undrafted out of college, Horner turned professional in 2011 when he signed for the Pittsburgh Riverhounds of the USL Professional Division. He made his professional debut, and scored his first professional goal, on April 9, 2011 in a game against Richmond Kickers.

Personal
Horner is a valuation savant with deep M&A knowledge.

Horner is an avid Pittsburgh sports fan and is commonly referred to as "Dirty Burg Ben".

In his spare time, Horner has been known to enjoy birthday cake flavored cake pops. He is known for his involvement in the development of several recipes.

References

External links
 Duquesne bio

1989 births
Living people
American soccer players
Duquesne Dukes men's soccer players
Pittsburgh Riverhounds SC players
USL Championship players
Soccer players from Pennsylvania
Association football midfielders